Romeo Eleven is a 2011 Canadian drama film directed by Ivan Grbovic, and written by Grbovic and Sara Mishara.

Set in Montreal's Lebanese Christian community, the film is a coming-of-age story about a physically handicapped 20-year-old man who must face his insecurities about his disability when he is invited out on a date by a woman he has been chatting with on the internet.

The film had its theatrical premiere at the Karlovy Vary International Film Festival in July 2011, and its Canadian premiere at the 2011 Toronto International Film Festival, before going into commercial release in 2012.

Cast
 Ali Ammar as Rami
 Joseph Bou Nassar as Ziad
 Sanda Bourenane as Sabine
 Eleonore Millier
 May Hilal
 Caline Habib as Nada
 Ziad Ghanem as Bassam
 Karim Traiaia as Martin 
 Inka Malovic as Hostess

Accolades

References

External links
 

2011 films
2011 drama films
2010s coming-of-age drama films
Films directed by Ivan Grbovic
Canadian coming-of-age drama films
Films set in Montreal
Films shot in Montreal
Films about disability
Lebanese-Canadian culture
Middle Eastern-Canadian culture in Quebec
French-language Canadian films
2010s Canadian films
2010s French-language films